Alexander S. Wilson (December 1, 1907 – December 9, 1994) was a Canadian sprinter who competed in both the 1928 Summer Olympics and the 1932 Summer Olympics. He was born in Montreal and died in Mission, Texas, United States.

In 1928 he won a bronze medal with the Canadian team in the 4 × 400 metres relay event. In the 400 metre competition as well as in the 800 metre contest he was eliminated in the semi-finals. Four years later, he won the silver medal in the 800 metre event and the bronze medal in the 400 metre competition. With the Canadian team he won another bronze medal in the 4 × 400 metre relay contest.

At the 1930 British Empire Games (now the Commonwealth Games) he won the gold medal in the 440 yards event and the bronze medal in the 880 yards competition. With the Canadian relay team he won the silver medal in the 4 × 440 yards contest. He was a track and field athlete at the University of Notre Dame and the Alex Wilson Invitational was named for him because he went on to coach the track and field team for several decades. At Notre Dame he won the 400 meter NCAA Outdoor Championship in 1932.

Awards
 Canadian Track Hall of Fame (1954)
 Helms Athletic Foundation Hall of Fame (1967)
 National Collegiate Athletic Association Cross Country Coaches Association National Coach of the Year (1972)
 US Track & Field & Cross Country Coaches Association Hall of Fame (2008)

References

External links

Alex Wilson the greatest sprinter
 
 

1907 births
1994 deaths
Anglophone Quebec people
Athletes from Montreal
Athletes (track and field) at the 1928 Summer Olympics
Athletes (track and field) at the 1930 British Empire Games
Athletes (track and field) at the 1932 Summer Olympics
Canadian expatriate sportspeople in the United States

Canadian male middle-distance runners
Canadian people of British descent
Canadian male sprinters
Commonwealth Games bronze medallists for Canada
Commonwealth Games gold medallists for Canada
Commonwealth Games silver medallists for Canada
Commonwealth Games medallists in athletics
Olympic bronze medalists for Canada
Olympic silver medalists for Canada
Olympic track and field athletes of Canada
Notre Dame Fighting Irish men's track and field athletes
Medalists at the 1928 Summer Olympics
Medalists at the 1932 Summer Olympics
Olympic silver medalists in athletics (track and field)
Olympic bronze medalists in athletics (track and field)
Medallists at the 1930 British Empire Games